Temptation (French: La tentation) is a 1929 French silent film directed by René Barberis and René Leprince and starring Lucien Dalsace, Clara Darcey-Roche and Fernand Mailly.

Cast
 Lucien Dalsace as Maître Robert Jourdan  
 Clara Darcey-Roche as La maman  
 Fernand Mailly as Monsieur de Bergue  
 André Nicolle as Lutard  
 Jean Peyrière as Maurice Brinon  
 Elmire Vautier as Madame Alfieri  
 Claudia Victrix as Irène de Bergue

References

Bibliography 
 Philippe Rège. Encyclopedia of French Film Directors, Volume 1. Scarecrow Press, 2009.

External links 
 

1929 films
French silent films
1920s French-language films
Films directed by René Barberis
Films directed by René Leprince
French films based on plays
French black-and-white films
Pathé films
1920s French films